Or(r)in, or Otteran is an anglicised spelling of the Irish given name Odhrán, historically spelled Oḋrán.

People
 Orin William Angwall (1890–1974), American politician and commercial fisherman
 Orrin Bacon (1821–1893), American politician
 Orrin Dubbs Bleakley (1854–1927), American politician
 Orrin N. Carter (1854–1928), American jurist
 Orrin Evans (born 1976), American jazz pianist
 Orrin C. Evans (1902–1971), pioneering African-American journalist and comic book publisher
 Orin Fowler (1791–1852), American politician
 Orrin Harold Griggs (1883-1058), American lawyer and politician
 Orin Hargraves (born 1953), American lexicographer and writer
 Orrin Hatch (1934-2022), United States Senator from Utah (1977–2019)
 Orrin Henry Ingram (1830–1918), American lumber baron and philanthropist
 Orrin Henry Ingram, Sr. (a.k.a. Hank Ingram) (1904–1963), American heir and businessman
 Orrin H. Ingram II (born 1960), American heir, businessman, and philanthropist
 Orrin Grimmell Judd (1906–1976), American federal judge and lawyer
 Orrin Keepnews (1923–2015), American jazz writer and record producer
 Orin Kerr (born 1971), American law professor and lawyer
 Orin Grant Libby (1864–1952), American historian
 Orrin Larrabee Miller (1856–1926), American politician
 Orrin P. Miller (1858–1918), member of the presiding bishopric of The Church of Jesus Christ of Latter-day Saints
 Orin G. Murfin (1876–1956), US Navy admiral
 Orin O'Brien (born 1935), American female double bassist
 Orrin H. Pilkey (born 1934), Professor Emeritus of Earth and Ocean Sciences
 Orrin W. Robinson (1834–1907), American politician and businessman
 Orrin Porter Rockwell (1813–1878), bodyguard of Joseph Smith
 Orin C. Smith (born 1942), chairman and former president and CEO of Starbucks
 Orin Starn, Professor and Chair of the Cultural Anthropology Department at Duke University
 Robert Orrin Tucker (1911–2011), American bandleader
 Orin de Waard (born 1983), footballer from Curaçao
 Orin Wilf (born 1973/74), American real estate developer

Fictional characters
 Orin Incandenza, in the book Infinite Jest by David Foster Wallace
 Orrin Sackett, featured in a number of western novels, short stories and historical novels by American writer Louis L'Amour
 Orin Scrivello, DDS, a character from the musical Little Shop of Horrors
 Orrin Pike, in the 1960s television program Petticoat Junction
 Orin Hanner Jr. and Sr., from the 1997 movie Fire Down Below
 Orin Aquaman and King Orin, DC Comics characters, of Atlantis 
 Orin Aquaman, better known Arthur Curry on the televisions show Smallville and Young Justice
 Orin, title character of Starchaser: The Legend of Orin, a 1985 American animated science-fiction adventure film
 Orin Boyd, protagonist of the movie Exit Wounds.
 Orin Mannon, one of the lead characters of Eugene O'Neill's 1931 play Mourning Becomes Electra
 Rin Kaenbyou, stage 5 boss from Touhou Project 11, (火焔猫 燐 Kaenbyō Rin?, nickname: Orin)
 Orin, in the comedy television series Parks and Recreation
 Sir Orrin Neville-Smythe, a protagonist from the 1982 children's fantasy film Flight of Dragons
 Orrin, the King of Surda, in Christopher Paolini's The Inheritance Cycle''

See also

Oren

Masculine given names
Irish masculine given names